Fouquières-lès-Béthune (literally Fouquières near Béthune) is a commune in the Pas-de-Calais department in the Hauts-de-France region of France.

Geography
The A26 autoroute passes by, just yards from the commune.

Population

Places of interest
 The church of St.Vaast, dating from the eighteenth century.
 An old manorhouse and an old farmhouse.
 Three nineteenth century chateaux.
 The Commonwealth War Graves Commission cemetery.

See also
Communes of the Pas-de-Calais department

References

External links

 The CWGC communal cemetery extension

Fouquiereslesbethune